Szarlota Pawel; actual name, Eugenia Joanna Pawel-Kroll (4 November 1947 – 7 September 2018) was a Polish comic book artist, creator of the popular series about "Kleks".

References

1947 births
2018 deaths
Polish comics artists
Polish female comics artists
Academy of Fine Arts in Warsaw alumni
Recipients of the Bronze Medal for Merit to Culture – Gloria Artis